Cleanliness is both the  state of being clean and free from germs, dirt, trash, or waste, and the habit of achieving and maintaining that state. Cleanliness is often achieved through cleaning. Culturally, cleanliness is usually a good quality, as indicated by the aphorism: "Cleanliness is next to Godliness", and may be regarded as contributing to other ideals such as health and beauty.

In emphasizing an ongoing procedure or set of habits for the purpose of maintenance and prevention, the concept of cleanliness differs from purity, which is a physical, moral, or ritual state of freedom from pollutants. Whereas purity is usually a quality of an individual or substance, cleanliness has a social dimension and direction or implies a system of interactions. "Cleanliness," observed Jacob Burckhardt, "is indispensable to our modern notion of social perfection." A household or workplace may be said to exhibit cleanliness, but not ordinarily purity; cleanliness also would be a characteristic of the people who maintain cleanness or prevent dirtying.

On a practical level, cleanliness is thus related to hygiene and disease prevention. Washing is one way of achieving physical cleanliness, usually with water and often some kind of soap or detergent. Cleaning procedures are of the utmost importance in many forms of manufacturing.

As an assertion of moral superiority or respectability, cleanliness has played a role in establishing cultural values in relation to social class, humanitarianism, and cultural imperialism.

Cleanliness is linked with proper hygiene.  A person who is said to be clean usually depicts cleanliness.

Religion

In Christianity 

The Bible has many rituals of purification relating to menstruation, childbirth, sexual relations, skin disease, death, and animal sacrifices. The Ethiopian Orthodox Tewahedo Church prescribes several kinds of hand washing for example after leaving the latrine, lavatory or bathhouse, or before prayer, or after eating a meal. The women in the Ethiopian Orthodox Tewahedo Church are prohibited from entering the church temple during menses; and the men do not enter a church the day after they have had intercourse with their wives.

Christianity has always placed a strong emphasis on hygiene, Despite the denunciation of the mixed bathing style of Roman pools by early Christian clergy, as well as the pagan custom of women naked bathing in front of men, this did not stop the Church from urging its followers to go to public baths for bathing, which contributed to hygiene and good health according to the Church Father, Clement of Alexandria. The Church also built public bathing facilities that were separate for both sexes near monasteries and pilgrimage sites; also, the popes situated baths within church basilicas and monasteries since the early Middle Ages. Pope Gregory the Great urged his followers on value of bathing as a bodily need.

In Hinduism

In Hinduism, cleanliness is an important virtue and the Bhagavad Gita describes it as one of the divine qualities which one must practice. The Sanskrit word for cleanliness is saucam. The Bhagavad Gita repeats this word in five slokas at 13.8, 16.3, 16.7, 17.14 and 18.42. Śrīmad Bhāgavatam mentioned saucam at 1.16.26, 1.17.24 (as one of the four legs of Satya Yuga or Golden Age), 1.17.42, 3.28.4 (as spiritual practice), 3.31.33 (those who are addicted to sex life will not understand cleanliness), 4.29.84 (purity of atman), 7.11.8-12 (one of the thirty qualities to be acquired), 7.11.21 (cleanliness as a characteristic of a Brahmin), 7.11.24 (cleanliness is a quality of the best worker), 11.3.24 (one should learn cleanliness to serve his or her guru), 11.17.16 (cleanliness is a natural quality of a Brahmin), 11.18.36 (cleanliness as a virtue among those who has realised God), 11.18.43 (quality to be practised by a householder), 11.21.14 (means of cleansing one body and mind), 11.19.36-39 (cleanliness means detachment from desire-prompted actions)  12.2.1 (effects of Kali Yuga on cleanliness).  

Srimad Bhagavatam also recognises cleanliness as one of the thirty qualities which one must acquire to obtain the grace of God and identifies internal and external cleanliness among the twelve regular duties. Cleanliness is also an exalted quality which characterises the Satya Yuga (Golden Age) in Hinduism. As stated by many Hindu scriptures that cleanliness is a way of relative to God.

Cleanliness or saucam is both internal and external. Hinduism extols not only external cleanliness but also internal cleanliness or purity. Since their minds are constantly absorbed in the all-pure lord, devotees become internally cleansed from the defects of lust, anger, greed, envy, ego, etc. In this state of mind, they naturally prefer to keep the external body and environment pure as well. Thus, in accordance with the old saying, "cleanliness is next to godliness", they are also externally pure.    

Cleanliness is also a virtue which has to be cultivated by Vedic students and spiritual aspirants.

Srimad Bhagavatam also explains the internal and external cleanliness as "My dear Uddhava, general cleanliness, washing the hands, bathing, performing religious services at sunrise, noon and sunset, worshiping Me, visiting holy places, chanting japa, avoiding that which is untouchable, uneatable or not to be discussed, and remembering My existence within all living entities as the Paramatman — these principles should be followed by all members of society through regulation of the mind, words and body."  

All Hindus must make a visit to the seven sacred rivers. Bathing in these rivers will purify the mind and increase their good merits. Therefore, to invoke the presence of the holy rivers, the following mantra is chanted before daily bath: "AUM gaṇge ca yamune caiva godāvarī sarasvatī | narmade siṇdhu kāverī jalesmin saṃnidhim kuru." [In this water, I invoke the presence of holy waters from the rivers Ganga, Yamuna, Godavari, Sarasvati, Narmada, Sindhu and Kaveri.]        

All Hindus must have taken a bath before entering temples in order to seek blessings. They also wash their feet before entering the temple. In some Orthodox Hindu households, taking a bath after visiting a funeral is required as some Hindus believe that it is an inauspicious thing to witness and the in-auspiciousness would follow. This is also related to the pollution of the River Ganges.

Hindus also clean their homes particularly well in preparing to celebrate Diwali each year as they believe that it brings good luck. Most Hindus also believe that keeping your house clean and great devotion are gestures to welcome the Goddess Lakshmi to their abode to stay. Some orthodox Hindus refrain from cleaning their houses on a Friday as it is a day dedicated to Goddess Lakshmi and cleaning homes on that day is considered inauspicious, so they are allowed to clean their homes on the rest of the days. Tamil people also keep their homes clean in preparation for Diwali, Pongal or Bhol.

Hinduism also gives a deeper meaning to cleanliness. In Srimad Bhagavatam 11.19.36-39, cleanliness is also defined as detachment from activities prompted by desire. Cleanliness, therefore, means to give up material attachment, not merely to frequently rinse one's skin with water.

In Islam

Islam stresses the importance of cleanliness and personal hygiene. There are many verses in the Quran which discuss cleanliness. For example, “…Truly, Allah loves those who turn to Him constantly and He 'loves those who keep themselves pure and clean” (2:222). And, “…In mosque, there are men who love to be clean and pure. Allah loves those who make themselves clean and pure” (9:108).

First lessons in Islamic manuals of catechism are matters of cleanliness. Subjects taught first in the book of cleanliness include: which are clean, what is clean and what is not clean, what people need to be cleansed from, how they should clean, and which water should they use to clean. Muslims are required to perform ablution (wudu) before every prayer, and are recommended to stay in the state of ablution at all times. A ritual bath (ghusl) is performed on Fridays before the Friday Prayer (Juma). Ritual baths are recommended for spiritual purity, also after committing a sin, and are necessary for those who have watched a funeral. Special attention is given to cleaning homes before the arrival of guests or before feasts (Eid al-Fitr and Eid al-Adha), and holy days and nights.

Islamic hygienical jurisprudence, which dates back to the 7th century, has a number of elaborate rules. Taharah (ritual purity) involves performing wudu (ablution) for the five daily salah (prayers), as well as regularly performing ghusl (bathing), which led to bathhouses being built across the Islamic world. Islamic toilet hygiene also requires washing with water after using the toilet, for purity and to minimize germs.

A basic form of the contagion/germ theory of disease dates back to medicine in the medieval Islamic world, where it was proposed by Persian physician Ibn Sina (also known as Avicenna) in The Canon of Medicine (1025). He mentioned that people can transmit disease to others by breath, noted contagion with tuberculosis, and discussed the transmission of disease through water and dirt. The concept of invisible contagion was eventually widely accepted by Islamic scholars. In the Ayyubid Sultanate, they referred to them as najasat ("impure substances"). The fiqh scholar Ibn al-Haj al-Abdari (c. 1250–1336), while discussing Islamic diet and hygiene, gave advice and warnings about how contagion can contaminate water, food, and garments, and could spread through the water supply.

Hygiene

Since the germ theory of disease, cleanliness has come to mean an effort to remove germs and other hazardous materials. A reaction to an excessive desire for a germ-free environment began to occur around 1989, when David Strachan put forth the "hygiene hypothesis" in the British Medical Journal. In essence, this hypothesis holds that environmental microbes play a useful role in developing the immune system; the fewer germs people are exposed to in early childhood, the more likely they are to experience health problems in childhood and as adults. The valuation of cleanliness, therefore, has a social and cultural dimension beyond the requirements of hygiene for practical purposes.

Industry
In industry, certain processes such as those related to integrated circuit manufacturing, require conditions of exceptional cleanliness which are achieved by working in cleanrooms. Cleanliness is essential to successful electroplating, since molecular layers of oil can prevent adhesion of the coating. The industry has developed specialized techniques for parts cleaning, as well as tests for cleanliness. The most commonly used tests rely on the wetting behaviour of a clean hydrophilic metal surface. Cleanliness is also important to vacuum systems to reduce outgassing. Cleanliness is also crucial for semiconductor manufacturing.

See also

Antiseptic
Aseptic technique
Cleaner
Cleaning
Clean room
Contamination control
Green cleaning
Hygiene
Lady Macbeth effect
 National Cleanup Day
Pollution
Environmental remediation
Ritual purification
Waste management

References

Hygiene
Cleaning
Virtue